A lancet window is a tall, narrow window with a pointed arch at its top. It acquired the "lancet" name from its resemblance to a lance. Instances of this architectural element are typical of Gothic church edifices of the earliest period. Lancet windows may occur singly, or paired under a single moulding, or grouped in an odd number with the tallest window at the centre.

The lancet window first appeared in the early French Gothic period (c. 1140–1200), and later in the English period of Gothic architecture (1200–1275). So common was the lancet window feature that this era is sometimes known as the "Lancet Period".

The term lancet window is properly applied to windows of austere form, without tracery. Paired windows were sometimes surmounted by a simple opening such as a quatrefoil cut in plate tracery.  This form gave way to the more ornate, multi-light traceried window.

Examples

See also

 Church window
 Monofora
 Polifora

References 

Gothic architecture
Church architecture
Windows
Architectural elements